Eduard Voldemarovich Lewandowski (born September 7, 1980) is a Russian born German professional ice hockey forward currently playing with Löwen Frankfurt in the DEL2.

Playing career
Lewandowski was drafted 242nd overall in the 8th round of the 2003 NHL Entry Draft by the Phoenix Coyotes. He never played in the North American leagues, instead plying his trade in his native Germany before moving to Russia to play in the Kontinental Hockey League in the prime of his career.

On May 29, 2013, Lewandowski moved to his fourth KHL club, in agreeing to a contract as a free agent with Avtomobilist Yekaterinburg.

After two seasons with Avtomobilist and seven years in Russia, Lewandowski opted to return to Germany as a free agent, signing a two-year contract with Düsseldorfer EG of the DEL on May 15, 2015.

Career statistics

Regular season and playoffs

International

References

External links

1980 births
Living people
Adler Mannheim players
Arizona Coyotes draft picks
Atlant Moscow Oblast players
Avtomobilist Yekaterinburg players
Düsseldorfer EG players
Eisbären Berlin players
Expatriate ice hockey players in Russia
German ice hockey right wingers
German people of Russian descent
Ice hockey players at the 2006 Winter Olympics
Kölner Haie players
Löwen Frankfurt players
HC Neftekhimik Nizhnekamsk players
Olympic ice hockey players of Germany
People from Krasnoturyinsk
HC Spartak Moscow players
Sportspeople from Sverdlovsk Oblast